Bernie Michael, known by the stage name Dixie Peach is a British radio DJ and musician.

Peach was one of the starting line-up on Radio Caroline when it re-launched on 20 August 1983.  He quickly gained popularity despite his haphazard broadcasting style because he used his backing singer skills to introduce songs - blending his voice into the song.

Peach joined BBC Radio 1 in 1984 presenting a Saturday evening show called Midnight Runner which specialised in American style rock and funk. He was the third black Radio DJ (after Al Matthews and Ranking Miss P) on Radio 1. On television, he hosted editions of Top of the Pops.

In 1987, he left Radio 1 and in 1991 joined CNFM where he hosted the morning show. He later departed from the station in late 1992 and joined BFBS Radio where he presented Music Choice Europe. A keen music fan, Peach has recorded backing vocals on songs for Elton John and Hall & Oates.

References

British radio DJs
Pirate radio personalities
Black British radio presenters
20th-century Black British male singers
BBC Radio 1 presenters
Living people
1960s births
Top of the Pops presenters